2005 European Youth Olympic Festival may refer to:

2005 European Youth Summer Olympic Festival
2005 European Youth Olympic Winter Festival